There have been two baronetcies created for persons with the surname Cross, both in the Baronetage of the United Kingdom. Both creations are extinct.

The Cross Baronetcy, of Marchbank Wood in the Parish of Kilpatrick Juxta in the County of Dumfries and of the City of
Glasgow, was created in the Baronetage of the United Kingdom on 5 July 1912 for Alexander Cross, Member of Parliament for Glasgow Camlachie from 1892 to 1910. The title became extinct on the death of the third Baronet in 1963.

The Cross Baronetcy, of Bolton-le-Moors in the County Palatine of Lancaster, was created in the Baronetage of the United Kingdom on 15 August 1941 for the politician and diplomat Ronald Cross. The title became extinct on his death in 1968.

Cross baronets, of Marchbank Wood and the City of Glasgow (1912)
Sir Alexander Cross, 1st Baronet (1847–1914)
Sir William Coats Cross, 2nd Baronet (1877–1947)
Sir Alexander Cross, 3rd Baronet (1880–1963)

Cross baronets, of Bolton-le-Moors (1941)
Sir Ronald Hibbert Cross, 1st Baronet (1896–1968)

References

Extinct baronetcies in the Baronetage of the United Kingdom